Whaitsiidae is an extinct family of therocephalian therapsids.

References

 
Permian first appearances
Permian extinctions
Prehistoric therapsid families